Stanislao Lèpri (12 June 1905 - 1980) was an Italian surrealist painter and former Italian consul to the Principality of Monaco.

Biography
Born in the house of "marquis Lepri marquis of Rota" Member of the Roman nobility, Stanislao Lèpri was the Italian consul for the Principality of Monaco. In 1941 he met Leonor Fini. In 1943 Lèpri is called back to Rome and Fini went with him until the end of the World War II. In 1946 they are back in Paris and Lèpri abandoned his diplomatic career to become a painter. When Fini met the Polish writer Konstanty Jeleński, known as Kot, in Rome in 1952, presented to her Fabrizio Clerici Jeleński joined Fini and Lepri in their Paris apartment and the three remained inseparable until their deaths.

Lèpri was also a theatre scenographer and illustrator, among other he did the scenes for Voyage aux états de la Lune by Cyrano de Bergerac and in 1950 the costumes for L'Armida in Florence for the Maggio Fiorentino.

References

1905 births
1980 deaths
Italian painters
20th-century Italian male artists
Italian surrealist artists